The following is a list of diseases of pears (Pyrus communis).

Bacterial diseases

Fungal diseases

Miscellaneous diseases and disorders

Nematodes, parasitic

Viruslike diseases

References
Common Names of Diseases, The American Phytopathological Society

Pear